The Southeast Papuan or Papuan Peninsula ("Bird's Tail") languages are a group of half a dozen small families of Papuan languages in the "Bird's Tail" (southeastern peninsula) of New Guinea that are part of the Trans–New Guinea (TNG) phylum.

Languages
The languages are as follows: 

Dagan (Meneao Range)
Owen Stanley Range
Koiarian (Koiari – Managalas Plateau)
Kwalean (Humene–Uare)
Manubaran (Mount Brown)
Mailu–Yareban
Yareban (Musa River)
Bauwaki
Mailuan (Cloudy Bay)

They have in common ya for 'you' (plural) instead of proto-TNG *gi.

Pronouns
Usher (2020) reconstructs the pronouns as:
{| 
! !!colspan=2|Owen Stanley !! colspan=2|Meneao (Dagan)
|-
! !!sg!!pl!!sg!!pl
|-
!1
|*na||?||*n[e/a]||*nu
|-
!2
|*ga||*ja||*g[e/a]||*j[e/a]
|-
!3
|*e (?)||*ie (?)||*me||*mV
|}

Lexical comparison
The lexical data below is from the Trans-New Guinea database and Usher (2020).

References

 
 
Trans–New Guinea languages